The Hamden Memorial Town Hall houses the municipal offices of the town of Hamden, Connecticut, and serves as a memorial to its military service people.  Located at junction of Dixwell and Whitney Avenues and completed in 1924, it is a prominent local example of Colonial and Classical Revival architecture.  It was listed on the National Register of Historic Places in 2001.

Description and history
Hamden Memorial Town Hall is located in central eastern Hamden, near the center of a commercial district at the junction of Dixwell and Whitney Avenues, major arteries passing through the town.  It is a two-story masonry structure, built out of load-bearing brick, cast stone, and concrete, with some steel reinforcement. Its exterior is predominantly red brick, with concrete stringcourses, entablatures and cornices.  Its dominant feature is the main entrance, which is set in a semi-elliptical curving colonnade at the street corner.  The colonnade has two-story fluted round columns with Ionic capitals, and is topped by a balustrade.  An ornate three-stage clock tower rises above.  The entrance leads to a large oval lobby, which serves as the town's war memorial.

Hamden was originally part of New Haven, and was separately incorporated in 1784.  Initially an agricultural community, it rapidly became a residential suburb of its urban neighbor in the early 20th century.  The town hall was completed in 1924 to a design by architect Richard Williams, a partner of William H. Allen of New Haven and a Hamden resident.   It cost $164,000 to build, an unusually large sum for the period.  It is stylistically Colonial Revival in form, but exhibits a significant number of Neo-Classical details.

See also
National Register of Historic Places listings in New Haven County, Connecticut

References

		
National Register of Historic Places in New Haven County, Connecticut
Government buildings on the National Register of Historic Places in Connecticut
Colonial Revival architecture in Connecticut
Neoclassical architecture in Connecticut
Government buildings completed in 1924
Town halls in Connecticut
Hamden, Connecticut